Soba is a village in northwestern Ivory Coast. It is in the sub-prefecture of Kani, Kani Department, Worodougou Region, Woroba District.

Until 2012, Soba was in the commune of Soba-Banandjé. In March 2012, Soba-Banandjé became one of 1126 communes nationwide that were abolished.

Notes

Populated places in Woroba District
Populated places in Worodougou